This article is a list of primates of the Orthodox Church in America (OCA).

Prior to the early 1920s, all Russian Orthodox Christians on the North American continent were under the direct jurisdiction of the Russian Orthodox Church.  This North American diocese (known by a number of names throughout its history) was ruled by a bishop or archbishop assigned by the Russian Church.

After the Bolshevik Revolution of 1917, communication between the Russian Orthodox Church and the churches of North America was almost completely cut off.  In 1920, Patriarch Tikhon of Moscow directed all Russian Orthodox churches outside of Russia to govern themselves autonomously until regular communication and travel could be resumed.  In addition, a handful of Orthodox communities that had been under the Russians but with a non-Russian background turned to Orthodox churches in their respective homelands for pastoral care and governance.

After declaring the autonomy of the North American Diocese (known as the "Metropolia") in February 1924, Archbishop Platon (Rozhdestvensky) became the first Metropolitan of All America and Canada.  Since that time, the primate of the OCA has been known as Metropolitan of All America and Canada, in addition to his role as the archbishop of an OCA diocese.  When the OCA (then known as the Russian Orthodox Greek Catholic Church in North America) was granted autocephaly by the Russian Church in 1970 (an act not recognized by all Orthodox jurisdictions), it was renamed the Orthodox Church in America, and the ruling Metropolitan was granted the additional title of His Beatitude.

References 

Primates of the Orthodox Church in America
 
Primates of the Orthodox Church in America
Orthodox Church in America